Watchers Reborn (also known as Watchers 4) is the 1998 sequel to the 1988 horror film Watchers. Directed by John Carl Buechler and starring Mark Hamill, the film is loosely based on the 1987 novel Watchers by Dean Koontz.

Plot
Ever since he lost his wife and son in a devastating fire, Detective Jack Murphy (Mark Hamill) has wandered around life in a fog. But he is forced to face his terrifying memories when his partner Gus is killed in a mysterious slaying. Killed in a manner too brutal to be human, too clever to be animal, the only clues to Gus's death are a vagabond golden retriever and Dr. Grace Hudson (Lisa Wilcox), the beautiful scientist who seeks him out.

Dr. Hudson tells Jack that Einstein, the dog, is actually one half of a super-secret government experiment. With an IQ of 140, the dog was designed as a tracker for a genetically engineered killing machine known as the Outsider. Jack and Grace must stop the Outsider from killing again while preventing Lem Johnson (Stephen Macht), a pitbull, and the NSA from terminating the experiment... killing everyone who has knowledge of its existence. But how do you stop a creature genetically predestined for murder?

Cast
 Mark Hamill as Detective Jack Murphy
 Lisa Wilcox as Dr. Grace Hudson
 Stephen Macht as Lem Johnson
 Gary Collins as Gus Brody

Release
The sequel did not receive the benefit of a theatrical release that the original did. Instead, the film went straight-to-video. The film was released on a DVD by New Concorde Home Entertainment in 2004. The film is notable in that Jason Voorhees actor Kane Hodder, who had previously worked with Buechler on Friday the 13th Part VII: The New Blood, has a minor role sans make-up. Also, musical legend Lou Rawls has a minor role as the coroner.

External links

1998 direct-to-video films
1998 horror films
American science fiction horror films
Films directed by John Carl Buechler
Direct-to-video sequel films
1998 films
Films based on works by Dean Koontz
Watchers (film series)
Films scored by Terry Plumeri
American detective films
Films about animal testing
Films about genetic engineering
1990s English-language films
1990s American films